Kaup may refer to:
Kapu, Karnataka (AKA Kaup), a village in Udupi district, Karnataka, India
Kaup (emporium), an early medieval trade settlement in the Curonian Lagoon
Heinrich Kaup (1912–1999), highly decorated Feldwebel in the Wehrmacht during World War II
Johann Jakob Kaup (1803–1873), German naturalist
Kaup–Kupershmidt equation, the nonlinear fifth-order partial differential equation